Michael William Hugh Vernon  (born 20 November 1944) is an English music executive studio owner, and record producer from Harrow, Middlesex. He produced albums for British blues artists and groups in the 1960s, working with the Bluesbreakers, David Bowie, Duster Bennett, Savoy Brown, Chicken Shack, Climax Blues Band, Eric Clapton, Fleetwood Mac, Peter Green, Danny Kirwan, John Mayall, Christine McVie and Ten Years After amongst others.

Biography
Vernon is best known as founder of the blues record label, Blue Horizon. He worked at Decca Records starting in 1963, and produced the Mayall-Clapton collaboration Blues Breakers with Eric Clapton (1966).

In 1967, he produced David Bowie's debut album for Deram Records. The 1971 Blue Horizon release Bring It Back Home featured Paul Kossoff and Rory Gallagher, each appearing on one track. Two years later, Vernon released a solo album, Moment of Madness, on Sire Records. He was also a member of Olympic Runners (1974–1979) and acted as producer for them. He was a producer and member of Rocky Sharpe and the Replays (1979–1983).  With the Replays he sang bass under the pseudonym of Eric Rondo. He founded the Indigo and Code Blue record labels in the 1990s.

Vernon came out of retirement to produce Dani Wilde's album Shine, and the second album by the British blues prodigy, Oli Brown. Brown's album entitled Heads I Win, Tails You Lose was released in March 2010.

In October 2013, Vernon was rewarded with a BASCA Gold Badge Award, in recognition of his unique contribution to music.

On 7 September 2018, Vernon's first album on Manhaton Records, Beyond The Blues Horizon, was released.  It featured twelve tracks, including nine new self-penned originals, and three covers from the catalogues of Brook Benton, Mose Allison and Clarence "Frogman" Henry. The release was supported by a European tour under the billing of 'Mike Vernon & The Mighty Combo'. Vernon's band, The Mighty Combo, consisted of Kid Carlos (guitar), Ian Jennings (upright bass), Matt Little (keyboards), Paul Tasker (saxophone) and Mike Hellier (drums).

Vernon was appointed Member of the Order of the British Empire (MBE) in the 2020 Birthday Honours for services to music.

Production discography

 1965 – Five Long Years – Eddie Boyd
 1965 - From the Land of Green Ginger - The Green Ginger Three
 1966 – Bluesbreakers with Eric Clapton – John Mayall & the Bluesbreakers
 1966 – Art Gallery – The Artwoods
 1966 – "Rubber Band" – David Bowie
 1966 – Sound of Sitar – Chim Kothari
 1967 – Champion Jack Dupree and His Blues Band – Champion Jack Dupree featuring Mickey Baker
 1967 – "Love You till Tuesday" – David Bowie
 1967 – The Blues Alone – John Mayall
 1967 – A Hard Road – John Mayall & the Bluesbreakers
 1967 – Crusade — John Mayall & the Bluesbreakers
 1967 – David Bowie – David Bowie
 1967 – Eddie Boyd and His Blues Band – Eddie Boyd (Liner notes)
 1967 – Raw Blues – Various Artists
 1967 – Shake Down – Savoy Brown
 1967 – Ten Years After – Ten Years After
 1968 – The 1968 Memphis Country Blues Festival – Various Artists
 1968 – Roosevelt Holts: Presenting The Country Blues (Production)
 1968 – 40 Blue Fingers, Freshly Packed and Ready to Serve – Chicken Shack
 1968 – 7936 South Rhodes – Eddie Boyd
 1968 – Bare Wires – John Mayall & the Bluesbreakers
 1968 – Blues from Laurel Canyon – John Mayall
 1968 – Long Overdue – Gordon Smith
 1968 – Diary of a Band, Vol. 1 – John Mayall & the Bluesbreakers
 1968 – Diary of a Band, Vol. 2 – John Mayall & the Bluesbreakers
 1968 – Getting to the Point – Savoy Brown
 1968 – Last Night's Dream – Johnny Shines
 1968 – Fleetwood Mac – Fleetwood Mac
 1968 – Mr. Wonderful – Fleetwood Mac
 1968 – Undead – Ten Years After (Liner notes)
 1968 – Fully Interlocking – The Web
 1968 – Memphis Hot Shots – Bukka White (Production, liner notes, photo)
 1969 – 100 Ton Chicken – Chicken Shack
 1969 – The Biggest Thing Since Colossus – Otis Spann (Liner notes)
 1969 – Blue Matter – Savoy Brown (Percussion, arranger, assistant)
 1969 – Fleetwood Mac in Chicago/Blues Jam in Chicago, Vols. 1-2 – Fleetwood Mac
 1969 – English Rose – Fleetwood Mac
 1969 – First Slice – Jellybread
 1969 – Heavy Blues – Champion Jack Dupree
 1969 – Looking Back – John Mayall (Liner notes)
 1969 – Midnight Jump – Sunnyland Slim
 1969 – O.K. Ken? – Chicken Shack
 1969 – Fiends And Angels – Martha Veléz
 1969 – Patent Pending – The Johnny Almond Music Machine
 1969 – The Pious Bird of Good Omen – Fleetwood Mac
 1969 – A Step Further – Savoy Brown (Percussion, bells)
 1969 – Stonedhenge – Ten Years After (Vocals)
 1969 – Presenting the Country Blues/Furry Lewis (Production, liner notes)
 1969 – Presenting the Country Blues/Mississippi Joe Callicott (Production, liner notes)
 1970 – Theraphosa Blondi – The Web
 1970 – Stars of the 1969–1970 Memphis Country Blues Festival – Various Artists
 1970 – Grease One for Me – Bacon Fat
 1970 – White Hot Blue Black – John L. Watson
 1970 – In and Out of Focus – Focus (Liner notes, supervisor)
 1970 – The End of the Game – Peter Green
 1970 – Accept – Chicken Shack
 1971 – Black Magic Woman – Fleetwood Mac
 1971 – Bring It Back Home – Mike Vernon (Harmonica, percussion, vocals)
 1971 – The Original Fleetwood Mac – Fleetwood Mac
 1971 – Moving Waves – Focus (Liner notes, supervisor)
 1971 – Rick Hayward – Rick Hayward (Liner notes)
 1971 – Thru the Years – John Mayall
 1972 – Alvin Lee and Company – Ten Years After
 1972 – Discovering the Blues – Robben Ford
 1972 – Focus 3 – Focus (Supervisor, backing vocals)
 1972 – Rocking at the Tweed Mill – Livin' Blues
 1973 – At the Rainbow – Focus (Supervisor)
 1973 – History of British Blues Vol. 1 (Various Artists) (Production, liner notes and on one song)
 1973 – Ram Jam Josey – Livin' Blues
 1974 – Burglar – Freddie King (Percussion)
 1974 – Hamburger Concerto – Focus
 1975 – Larger Than Life – Freddie King (Percussion)
 1975 – Love Is a Five Letter Word – Jimmy Witherspoon (Percussion)
 1975 – Out in Front – Olympic Runners (Percussion)
 1975 – Vintage Years – Fleetwood Mac
 1976 – Do You Wanna Do a Thing – Bloodstone
 1976 – Gold Plated – Climax Blues Band
 1976 – Live – Jimmy Witherspoon & Robben Ford (Executive production, editing, mixing)
 1977 – Best of Savoy Brown – Savoy Brown
 1977 – Edwin Starr – Edwin Starr (Tambourine, vibraslap)
 1977 – Hot to Trot – Olympic Runners (Percussion, vocals)
 1977 – On the Line – Foster Brothers
 1977 – Ship of Memories – Focus
 1977 – Soul Survivors – Diversions
 1978 – Focus con Proby – Focus (Liner notes, supervisor)
 1978 – Puttin' It Onya - Olympic Runners (Percussion, vocals)
 1979 – Let It Roll – Dr. Feelgood
 1979 – Out of the Ground – Olympic Runners (Percussion)
 1979 – Rama Lama – Rocky Sharpe and the Replays 
 1980 – Rock-It-To Mars – Rocky Sharpe and the Replays
 1980 – Let's Go (Shout! Shout!) – Rocky Sharpe and the Replays
 1981 – Level 42 – Level 42
 1982 – The Pursuit of Accidents – Level 42
 1983 – Stop! Please Stop! – Rocky Sharpe and the Replays
 1983 – Good Rockin' Tonight – Johnny & the Roccos (Production)
 1984 – End of the Line – Pete McDonald
 1985 – Graffiti – New Jordal Swingers
 1986 – Mad Man Blues – Dr. Feelgood
 1986 – On the Loose – Steve Gibbons
 1987 – Hat Trick – Blues 'N' Trouble (Percussion)
 1987 – Guitar Guitar – 32/20
 1988 – Crossroads – Eric Clapton
 1988 – Great British Psychedelic Trip, Vol. 1, 1966-69 – Various Artists
 1988 – John Mayall and the Bluesbreakers – John Mayall
 1988 – Roachford – Roachford
 1988 – Songs for the Weekend – New Jordal Swingers
 1989 – Level Best – Level 42
 1989 – Singles – The UA Years – Dr. Feelgood
 1989 – Steel & Fire – The Mick Clarke Band (Engineer)
 1989 - Mick 'Wildman' Pini  – Mick Pini
 1989 – Storyteller - The Complete Anthology: 1964–1990 – Rod Stewart
 1990 – Blues It Up – Dana Gillespie (Percussion)
 1991 – That's What The Blues Can Do – The Innes Sibun Blues Explosion (Production)
 1991 – Second Sight – Chris Youlden (Vocals, engineer)
 1992 – 25 Years - The Chain – Fleetwood Mac
 1992 – Attack of the Atomic Guitar – U.P. Wilson (Engineer, mixing)
 1992 – Blue Lightning – Lightnin' Slim (Mixing)
 1992 – Blues, the Whole Blues & Nothing But the Blues – Jimmy Witherspoon (Percussion, engineer, mixing, liner notes)
 1992 – Chiswick Story – Various Artists
 1992 – Delta Bluesman – David Honeyboy Edwards
 1993 – Dog Days Are Over – The Scabs
 1993 – Delta Hurricane – Larry McCray
 1993 – Clima Raro – Danza Invisible
 1994 – Live Dog – The Scabs
 1994 – Sound Like This – The Hoax
 1994 – Al Compás de la Banda – Danza Invisible
 1995 – Dos Caras Distintas – Los Secretos
 1996 – A Man Amongst Men – Bo Diddley (Production, liner notes, percussion)
 1997 – Me To You – Eric Bibb (Production, backing vocals, percussion)
 1998 – Swango – Candye Kane (Production, backing vocals, tambourine)
 1999 – The Complete Blue Horizon Sessions 1967–1969 – Fleetwood Mac (Production)
 2007 – The Complete Blue Horizon Sessions – Otis Spann (Production)
 2007 – Furry Lewis & Mississippi Joe Callicott – The Complete Blue Horizon Sessions (Production, liner notes, photos)
 2007 – The 1968 Memphis Country Blues festival – Bukka White The Complete Blue Horizon Sessions (Production, liner notes, photos)
 2008 – The Complete Blue Horizon Sessions – Jellybread (Production, liner notes)
 2008 – The Complete Blue Horizon Sessions – Top Topham (Production, liner notes)
 2008 – The Complete Blue Horizon Sessions – Key Largo (Production, liner notes)
 2008 – The Complete Blue Horizon Sessions – Gordon Smith (Production, liner notes)
 2008 – The Complete Blue Horizon Sessions – Eddie Boyd (Production, liner notes)
 2008 – The Complete Blue Horizon Sessions – Champion Jack Dupree (Production, liner notes)
 2010 – Heads I Win, Tails You Lose – Oli Brown (Production)
 2010 – Shine – Dani Wilde (Production)
 2010 – Fun to Visit – Mingo & The Blues Intruders (Production)
 2015 - Just A Little Bit - Mike Vernon & Los García (vocals & kazoo - Production & liner notes)
 2016 – Take Me High – Laurence Jones (Production)
 2016 – A Force of Nature – Sari Schorr (Production)

Bibliography
 Bob Brunning, Blues: The British Connection, Helter Skelter Publishing, London 2002,  - First edition 1986 - Second edition 1995 Blues in Britain
 Bob Brunning, The Fleetwood Mac Story: Rumours and Lies, Omnibus Press London, 1990 and 1998, 
 Martin Celmins, Peter Green - Founder of Fleetwood Mac, Sanctuary London, 1995, foreword by B.B.King, 
 Dick Heckstall-Smith, The safest place in the world: A personal history of British Rhythm and blues, 1989 Quartet Books Limited,   - Second Edition : Blowing The Blues - Fifty Years Playing The British Blues, 2004, Clear Books, 
 Christopher Hjort, Strange brew: Eric Clapton and the British blues boom, 1965-1970, foreword by John Mayall, Jawbone 2007, 
 Paul Myers, Long John Baldry and the Birth of the British Blues, Vancouver 2007, GreyStone Books, 
 Harry Shapiro, Alexis Korner: The Biography, Bloomsbury Publishing PLC, London 1997, Discography by Mark Troster, 
 Mike Vernon, The Blue Horizon Story 1965-1970 vol.1, notes from the booklet of the box set (60 pages)

References

External links
 FleetwoodMac.net information
 Mike Vernon & The Mighty Combo - Official Website

1944 births
Living people
English record producers
English male singers
Blues record producers
People from Harrow, London
Members of the Order of the British Empire